Dokdonella kunshanensis is a Gram-negative, aerobic, non-spore-formin and non-motile bacterium from the genus of Dokdonella which has been isolated from activated sludge from a wastewater treatment plant in China.

References

External links
Type strain of Dokdonella kunshanensis at BacDive -  the Bacterial Diversity Metadatabase

Xanthomonadales
Bacteria described in 2013